North Carolina's 6th Senate district is one of 50 districts in the North Carolina Senate. It has been represented by Republican Michael Lazzara since 2021.

Geography
Since 2023, the district has covered all of Onslow County. The district overlaps with the 14th, 15th, and 16th state house districts.

District officeholders since 1985

Election results

2022

2020

2018

2016

2014

2012

2010

2008

2006

2004

2002

2000

References

North Carolina Senate districts
Onslow County, North Carolina